USS Salem (CM-11) was a commercial cargo ship, that served as a minelayer and then net laying ship of the United States Navy during World War II.

The ship was built in 1916 by William Cramp & Sons, Philadelphia, as SS Joseph R. Parrott; was acquired by the U.S. Navy on 8 June 1942 from the Maritime Commission; and commissioned on 9 August 1942.

Service history

Invasion of North Africa 
Following training exercises, Salem departed Brooklyn, New York, on 13 November 1942, as part of a convoy, and arrived at Casablanca on 1 December. She laid 202 mines off that port on 27 and 28 December and helped fight off an air raid there on 31 December. On 20 January 1943, she sailed from Casablanca and arrived at Norfolk, Virginia, on 9 February.

Invasion of Italy 
After repairs, she left the United States again on 13 June and arrived at Oran on 5 July. Returning to Oran on 17 July, Salem subsequently carried 255 British troops from Gibraltar to Oran and then moved to Bizerte in preparation for landings in Italy. However, her role in these landings was cancelled due to the Italian surrender. The ship left Mers el Kebir on 7 October and returned to New York on 26 October.

Pacific Theatre operations 
Salem was repaired at Norfolk, Virginia, and carried out local operations along the Atlantic coast until 11 May 1944, when she departed Hampton Roads, Virginia, for duty with Service Squadron 6 in the Pacific. On 27 June, she sailed from Pearl Harbor with a cargo of ammunition, which she offloaded to shore facilities and combatant ships after her arrival at Eniwetok on 8 July. She then shuttled between Eniwetok, Kwajalein, Makin, Majuro, Saipan, and Tinian, helping to carry ammunition to forward areas for issue to the fleet. After arrival on 5 November, she underwent repairs and temporary conversion into a net cargo ship.

Conversion to net cargo ship 
Salem completed conversion on 10 February 1945 and departed Pearl Harbor on 18 February with a cargo of anti-torpedo nets. After stops at Eniwetok, Ulithi, and Leyte, Salem arrived off Kerama Retto on 26 March 1945 as troops went ashore to secure the island and its harbor for use as a fleet base for the invasion of Okinawa. During the next two days, Salem laid antisubmarine nets to protect the harbor.

Frequent air attacks 
Japanese air attacks were frequent; and, on 2 April, Salem's gunners helped shoot down a plane that was trying to crash into . Salem departed Kerama Retto two days later and arrived at Pearl Harbor on 27 April, where she picked up a new cargo of nets. Departing Pearl Harbor on 24 May, she unloaded her nets at Guam between 12 and 19 June, and then proceeded to Eniwetok where she repaired nets between 24 June and 31 July.

Renamed 
Salem returned to Pearl Harbor on 10 August, and on 15 August, the day fighting stopped in the Pacific, was renamed as USS Shawmut to permit a new cruiser to be named .

End-of-War deactivation 
Departing Pearl Harbor on 31 August, she arrived at San Francisco, California, on 10 September for inactivation. Shawmut was decommissioned on 6 December 1945, struck from the Navy List on 3 January 1946, and transferred to the Maritime Commission on 20 June 1946. She was sold on 7 March 1947 to the West India Fruit and Steamship Company, and served as  under the Honduran flag until 1970.

Awards 
American Campaign Medal
Asiatic-Pacific Campaign Medal with one battle star
European-African-Middle Eastern Campaign Medal with one battle star
World War II Victory Medal

References

External links
 NavSource Online: Mine Warfare Vessel Photo Archive - Shawmut (CM-11) - ex-Salem

1916 ships
Unique minelayers of the United States Navy
World War II mine warfare vessels of the United States
Ships built by William Cramp & Sons